PMC may refer to:

Computing
 Pacific Microelectronics Centre, acquired by Sierra Semiconductor in 1994 to form PMC-Sierra
 Parallel model combination, a hidden Markov model-based method for speech recognition
 PCI Mezzanine Card, a printed circuit board
 Polymorphic containers, a feature of the Parrot virtual machine
 Portable Media Center, a hard drive-based portable media player
 Programmable metallization cell, new memory technology that uses copper nanowires

Education
 Pine Manor College, Massachusetts, United States
 Plymouth College, United Kingdom
 Poonch Medical College, Azad Kashmir, Pakistan
 Punjab Medical College, now Faisalabad Medical University, Pakistan

Hospitals
 Palomar Medical Center, California, United States
 Parrish Medical Center, Florida, United States

Military
 Philippine Marine Corps
 Popular Mobilization Forces (Iraq)
 Private military company
 Private military contractor – personnel of the company
 President of the Mess Committee

Municipal corporations
 Patna Municipal Corporation
 Pune Municipal Corporation
 Potato Marketing Corporation of Western Australia

Organizations
 Paleozoological Museum of China

Places
 El Tepual Airport (IATA: PMC, ICAO: SCTE), Chile
 Palais de la musique et des congrès, a music and convention venue in France
 Pine Mountain Club, California, United States

Publishing and entertainment
 Panjabi MC (born 1971), British hip hop DJ
 Penske Media Corporation, a publishing company
 Persian Music Channel, a TV network
 PMC Ltd. (Professional Monitor Company), a manufacturer of loudspeakers
 PMC: The Bunker, native title of the South Korean film Take Point

Science and medicine
 Paramyotonia congenita, a genetic disorder
 PhysMath Central, a defunct journal imprint
 Pontine micturition center, part of the brainstem
 Premotor cortex, part of the cerebral cortex
 Pseudomembranous colitis, a disease of the colon
 PubMed Central, a collection of journal articles

Other uses
 Pakistan Medical Commission, a statutory regulatory authority for medical and dental practitioners
 Pan-Massachusetts Challenge, a charity bike-a-thon
 Partially mission capable, a measure of system availability in the military
 Philippine Marine Corps, part of the Philippine Navy
 Politico-media complex, a name given to the network of relationships between a state's political classes and its media industry
 Polymer matrix composite, a composite material
 Population Media Center, an organization headquartered in Vermont, United States
 Precious Metal Clay, a brand of metal clay
 Presidential Memorial Certificate, United States
 Pressed Metal Corporation, an Australian automotive manufacturer
 Professional-managerial class, a social class within capitalism
 Project management committee
 Punjab & Maharashtra Co-operative Bank
 Pyeonghwa Motors Corp., a car manufacturer in North Korea
 Pearl Milling Company,a Brand commonly known for Pancake/Waffle Mix and Maple Syrup.

See also
 PMCS (disambiguation)